Drake Hill Road Bridge, also known as the Old Drake Hill Flower Bridge, is a bridge in Simsbury, Connecticut, originally carrying Drake Hill Road over the Farmington River.  Built in 1892, it is one of three surviving Parker truss bridges in the state.  It was listed on the National Register of Historic Places in 1984.  It now carries foot traffic only.

Description and history
The Drake Hill Road Bridge is located a short way southeast of the town center of Simsbury. It is located between Old Bridge Road, a former alignment of Drake Hill Road, and Riverside Road, which parallels the east bank of the Farmington River. Drake Hill Road now passes to the north, crossing the river on a modern bridge. This bridge is a single-span, pin-connected Parker through truss constructed with wrought iron, cast iron and steel. It has a wooden plank deck suitable for foot traffic, and its sides are adorned with planters that are seasonally filled with flowers.

The bridge was built in 1892, and is one of three 19th-century Parker trusses to survive in the state.  All three were designed by J.H. Buddington, an engineer for the state highway department.  This bridge was built as a replacement for a timber-frame bridge that previously stood on the site.  The town recognized the need for replacing the older structure in 1890, but financing of the replacement delayed its construction.  The bridge was taken out of vehicular service in 1992, when the present alignment of Drake Hill Road was established.  This bridge is now open strictly for pedestrian and bicycle traffic.

See also

National Register of Historic Places listings in Hartford County, Connecticut
List of bridges on the National Register of Historic Places in Connecticut

References

Road bridges on the National Register of Historic Places in Connecticut
Bridges completed in 1892
Buildings and structures in Hartford County, Connecticut
Simsbury, Connecticut
National Register of Historic Places in Hartford County, Connecticut
Wrought iron bridges in the United States
Iron bridges in the United States
Steel bridges in the United States
Parker truss bridges in the United States